Claude Alfred Wharton  (15 October 1914 – 3 January 2003) was a member of the Queensland Legislative Assembly.

Biography
Wharton was born at Gayndah, Queensland, the son of William Alfred Wharton and his wife Daisy May (née Schlemer). He was educated at Ginoondan State School before attending Maryborough Grammar School. He was a grazier and a breeder of stud cattle and pigs. He later became a director of the Queensland Bacon Pty Ltd and the Queensland Cold Storage Cooperative Federation Ltd.

On 11 November 1942 he married Pearl Estelle Dent (died 2005) at St Matthew's Church in Gayndah and together had two sons and a daughter. 

He was a Parish Councillor of the Anglican Church in Gayndah and a member of the local Masonic Lodge.

Wharton died in January 2003 and was buried in the Gayndah Cemetery.

Public career
Wharton, a member of the Country Party (later known as both the National Country Party and the National Party), won the reincarnated seat of Burnett at the 1960 Queensland state election. He went on to represent the electorate for 26 years, retiring in 1986.

As the Minister for Works, Wharton visited many schools in the days when it was customary for the school to be given a day's holiday on the visit of a Minister. In fact, he visited so many schools that he became known as "Holiday Claude".

He held many roles whilst in parliament including the following:
 Minister for Aboriginal and Islanders Advancement 1975
 Minister for Works and Housing 1977-1986
 Member of the Parliamentary Building Committee 1969-1974
 Temporary Chairman of Committees 1970-1974
 Member of the Parliamentary Delegation to New Zealand and South Pacific 1970
 Delegate to the General Conference of the Commonwealth Parliamentary Association in London 1973
 Member of the Standing Orders Committee 1979
 Leader of the Parliamentary Delegation to Fiji, Tonga and Samoa 1984 
 Minister for Aboriginal and Islanders Advancement and Fisheries 1975-1977
 Leader of the House 1979-1986

Honours 
For his services as a Minister of the Crown, Wharton was awarded the Queensland Companion of the Most Distinguished Order of St Michael and St George (CMG) in 1985. 

He was the President and International Director of the Rotary Club of Gayndah, receiving Rotary's highest honour - the Paul Harris Fellowship in 1999.

Legacy 

 Claude Wharton Weir in Gayndah 
 Claude Wharton Park, Brooweena 
 Claude Wharton Drive, Monduran, 
 Claude Wharton Drive, Miriam Vale
 Claude Wharton Building Bundaberg 
 In Gayndah, a plaque commemorates the commissioning of the fountain and surrounds at Gayndah Court House on 10th November 1979 by Honourable Claude Wharton.

References

Australian Companions of the Order of St Michael and St George
Members of the Queensland Legislative Assembly
1914 births
2003 deaths
National Party of Australia members of the Parliament of Queensland
20th-century Australian politicians